North Calcutta Polytechnic , established in 1976, is a government polytechnic located in 15, Gobinda Mondal Road, CIT, Satchasi Para in Kolkata, West Bengal.

About college
This polytechnic is affiliated to the West Bengal State Council of Technical Education,  and recognised by AICTE, New Delhi.

See also

References

External links
 Admission to Polytechnics in West Bengal for Academic Session 2006-2007
Official website WBSCTE

Universities and colleges in Kolkata
Educational institutions established in 1986
1986 establishments in West Bengal
Technical universities and colleges in West Bengal